Jaśkowo-Leśniczówka is a village in the administrative district of Gmina Pisz, within Pisz County, Warmian-Masurian Voivodeship, in northern Poland.

Before 1945 the area was called Jäskendorf and was part of East Prussia in Germany.

References

Villages in Pisz County